Victor Garfield Skinner (May 12, 1882 – May 21, 1960) was an American politician in the state of Washington. He served in the Washington House of Representatives from 1933 to 1939. he was also the Sergeants at Arms of the House of Representatives from 1949 to 1953.

References

1960 deaths
1882 births
Democratic Party members of the Washington House of Representatives
20th-century American politicians